Guangzhou Aircraft Maintenance Engineering Company Limited (Chinese:广州飞机维修工程有限公司), better known as GAMECO, is an aircraft maintenance company in Guangzhou, China. Located at Guangzhou Baiyun International Airport, GAMECO provides maintenance, repair and overhaul (MRO) services.

History

Founding 
GAMECO is founded as a joint venture of China Southern Airlines, Hutchison A/C Maintenance Investment and South China Int'l A/C Engineering in October 1989. China Southern Airlines is also the biggest customer of GAMECO. The swift progress made by CSN promotes GAMECO's development.

Awards 
GAMECO ranks No.6 of Top 10 Airframe MRO 2014 by Aviation Week in May, 2015.

Facility

Hangars 
Phase I hangar is located at Guangzhou Baiyun International Airport. As the largest truss structure hangar in China, the main hall can accommodate 4 wide-body aircraft, or 12 narrow-body aircraft for all level maintenance. The dedicated paint hangar is equipped with advanced control system of ventilation, temperature and humidity for one A380 or B747 aircraft painting. 
 
The Phase II Hangar is located at the south of the Maintenance Base, starts service in August 2013 with offering eight maintenance bays. The sophisticated docking systems are installed in four bays for heavy maintenance of narrow-body aircraft. The rest bays can support short time or line maintenance services for any type of aircraft except A380.

GAMECO plan to build Phase III, a wide-body aircraft hangar on the northern end of the Maintenance Base. The third hangar will be able to concurrently hold four widebodies and eight narrowbodies. It will receives 72% of GAMECO's business from maintaining the fleet of China Southern Airlines, to allow bringing in more third party work.

See also 
China Southern Airlines - shareholders and main customer

References 

Aircraft engineering companies